Il Pioniere (Italian: The Pioneer) was a weekly children's comic magazine which existed between 1950 and 1970. It was headquartered in Rome, Italy. The magazine was close to the Italian Communist Party although it did not overtly contain political writings.

History and profile

Il Pioniere was founded in Rome as a weekly magazine in 1950. The magazine was the official media outlet of a scout organization, namely Italian Pioneers' Association. The Communist Party officials invited Gianni Rodari to Rome to launch Il Pioniere. Its first directors of the magazine were Gianni Rodari and Dina Rinaldi. Rodari served in the post until 1953.

Il Pioniere supported anti-fascism, democracy and pacifism. The magazine did not contain any political messages, but attempted to provide a moral and ideal message using its illustrated stories and tales to its readers. However, it featured leading Communist leaders, including Yugoslav leade Josip Broz Tito. It covered Italian comics, including Cipollino, Chiodino and Atomino, and did not feature any American comics.

Il Pioniere began to decline in 1966 and folded in 1970.

References

External links

1950 establishments in Italy
1970 disestablishments in Italy
Anti-fascism in Italy
Defunct magazines published in Italy
Children's magazines published in Italy
Comics magazines published in Italy
Communist magazines
Italian-language magazines
Magazines established in 1950
Magazines disestablished in 1970
Magazines published in Rome
Weekly magazines published in Italy